Eric Appiah Ansu (born 8 May 2001) is an Ghanaian professional footballer who plays as a forward for Serbian SuperLiga side Metalac Gornji Milanovac.

Club career
Appiah made his professional debut for Club Brugge's reserve side, Club NXT in the Belgian First Division B against RWDM47. He started as NXT lost 0–2.

Career statistics

Club

References

External links
Profile at the UEFA website

2001 births
Living people
Ghanaian footballers
Association football forwards
Club NXT players
Challenger Pro League players
FK Metalac Gornji Milanovac players
Serbian SuperLiga players
Ghana youth international footballers
Ghanaian expatriate footballers
Ghanaian expatriate sportspeople in Belgium
Ghanaian expatriate sportspeople in Serbia
Expatriate footballers in Belgium
Expatriate footballers in Serbia